Capitale-Nationale is one of the 17 administrative regions of Quebec. It is anchored by the provincial capital, Quebec City, and is largely coextensive with that city's metropolitan area. It has a land area of 18,797.45 km2. It reported a total resident population of 729,997 as of the Canada 2016 Census, with Quebec City having 73.7 percent of the total.

Prior to January 2000, it was known as the Québec administrative region.

Administrative divisions

Regional county municipalities

Equivalent territory

Independent parish municipality
 Notre-Dame-des-Anges

Native People's Reserve
 Wendake

Major communities
Baie-Saint-Paul
Boischatel
Donnacona
L'Ancienne-Lorette
La Malbaie
Lac-Beauport
Pont-RougeQuebec City (Ville de Québec)
Saint-Augustin-de-Desmaures
Sainte-Brigitte-de-Laval
Sainte-Catherine-de-la-Jacques-Cartier
Saint-Raymond
Shannon
Stoneham-et-Tewkesbury

School Districts 
25 Districts Francophones manage by 5 school service centres :
5 of Commission scolaire de Charlevoix (Charlevoix and Charlevoix-Est).
5 of Commission scolaire des Découvreurs
5 of Commission scolaire de la Capitale
5 of Commission scolaire de Portneuf
5 of Commission scolaire des Premières-Seigneuries

District Anglophone:
 Central Quebec School Board

See also
List of Quebec regions

References

Commission de toponymie - Topos sur le Web - Listing for Capitale-Nationale

External links

Portail régional de la Capitale-Nationale Official website
CRÉ

 
Metropolitan areas of Quebec
Administrative regions of Quebec